Dr. Veselin Vukotić is Montenegrin economist, professor, politician, and co-owner of Donja Gorica University. During 1985-1988 he was part of the cabinet of Montenegro's Prime Minister Vuko Vukadinović. He served as a Minister for Privatization and Entrepreneurship in the government of the Socialist Federal Republic of Yugoslavia from 1989 to 1992.

References

Living people
Montenegrin economists
Government ministers of Yugoslavia
1949 births